Disco Nights is the debut album by American soul/disco group GQ, released in 1979 on the Arista label.  The lead single "Disco Nights (Rock Freak)" was a major crossover hit, topping the R&B chart and peaking at #12 on the pop chart.  The follow-up, a cover of Billy Stewart's 1965 classic "I Do Love You", also made the R&B top 5 and the pop top 20.  On the back of its hit singles, the album became a big seller. It reached #2 R&B and #13 pop and was certified Platinum (one million copies shipped) by the RIAA.

This album should not be confused with a later GQ compilation of the same name, and with a similar cover image.

Track listing 
All songs written by Emanuel LeBlanc, Herb Lane, Keith Crier and Paul Service except where noted.
  "Disco Nights (Rock-Freak)" - 5:51
  "Make My Dreams a Reality" - 6:12
  "It's Your Love" - 4:14
  "Spirit" - 3:46
  "This Happy Feeling" - 5:22
  "Wonderful" - 5:08
  "Boogie Oogie Oogie" (Janice Johnson, Perry Kibble) - 4:14
  "I Do Love You" (Billy Stewart) - 4:45

Credits
Produced by: Larkin Arnold, Beau Ray Fleming, Jimmy Simpson
Arranged by: GQ, Ray Chew (horns)
Lead Guitar, Rhythm Guitar, Lead Vocals: Emmanuel Rahiem LeBlanc
Bass, Backing Vocals: Keith Crier
Keyboards, Backing Vocals: Herb Lane
Drums, Backing Vocals: Paul Service

Charts

Singles

References

1979 debut albums
GQ (band) albums
Albums recorded at Sigma Sound Studios
Arista Records albums